Alabaster Box may refer to:
 Alabaster Box (album), a 1999 album by gospel artist CeCe Winans
Alabaster Box (band), a Christian rock band from Australia
Alabaster Box (group), a Christian a capella/afropella group from Ghana